Taşova District is a district of Amasya Province of Turkey. Its seat is the town Taşova. Its area is 971 km2, and its population is 30,123 (2021).

Composition
There is one municipality in Taşova District:
 Taşova

There are 63 villages in Taşova District:

 Alçakbel
 Alpaslan
 Altınlı
 Andıran
 Ardıçönü
 Arpaderesi
 Ballıca
 Belevi
 Boraboy
 Çakırsu
 Çalkaya
 Çambükü
 Çaydibi
 Çılkıdır
 Dereköy
 Dereli
 Destek
 Devre
 Dörtyol
 Durucasu
 Dutluk
 Elmakırı
 Esençay
 Gemibükü
 Geydoğan
 Gökpınar
 Güngörmüş
 Gürsu
 Güvendik
 Hacıbeyköyü
 Hüsnüoğlu
 Ilıcaköy
 Ilıpınar
 Karabük
 Karamuk
 Karlık
 Karsavul
 Kavaloluğu
 Kırkharman
 Kızgüldüren
 Korubaşı
 Kozluca
 Kumluca
 Mercimekköy
 Mülkbükü
 Özbaraklı
 Şahinler
 Sepetli
 Şeyhli
 Sofualan
 Tatlıpınar
 Tekke
 Tekpınar
 Türkmendamı
 Uluköy
 Yayladibi
 Yaylasaray
 Yenidere
 Yerkozlu
 Yeşiltepe
 Yeşilyurt
 Yolaçan
 Yukarıbaraklı

References

Districts of Amasya Province